Rolando Peña (born October 27, 1942, in Caracas, Venezuela) is a Venezuelan-American visual artist and dancer. He is best known as one of the Warhol superstars, and he participated in a number of Warhol films.
 

Among Warhol superstars, Peña is known as "the Black Prince", or "El Principe Negro".

He was awarded a Guggenheim Fellowship during 2009.

Exhibitions
Peña's early work on photomaton photography, was recently show at an exhibition in Miami, Florida.

References

Living people
1942 births
Venezuelan emigrants to the United States
American male dancers
Venezuelan male dancers